Zis Boom Bah,  also known as College Sweethearts, is a 1941 American musical comedy film directed by William Nigh, and starring Grace Hayes, Peter Lind Hayes and Mary Healy. The plot concerns a vaudeville singer who comes to a floundering college to instill values and self-confidence in its entitled students.

Plot 
Grace Hayes—essentially playing herself—has been playing the vaudeville circuit to finance her son's college education after her wealthy family has shunned her.

Tiring of the road, she goes incognito to visit her son, Peter Kendricks (played by her real-life son Peter Lind Hayes) with her personal assistant Mary Healy (played by her real-life daughter-in-law of the same name).

She finds her son and the college "going to Hell in a hand basket", despite the earnest efforts of the kindhearted Dean, Prof. Warren (played by Richard "Skeets" Gallagher). The college and the old families are running out of money and spirit.

Grace buys the local diner, turns it into a version of her real-life club, and encourages the kids to put on a show to raise the funds and spirit the college needs to survive.

Cast 
Grace Hayes as Grace Hayes
Peter Lind Hayes as Peter Kendricks
Mary Healy as Mary Healy
Huntz Hall as Skeets Skillhorn
Jan Wiley as Annabella
Frank Elliott as Mr. Kendricks
Richard "Skeets" Gallagher as Professor Warren
Benny Rubin as Nick
Eddie Kane as James J. Kane
Leonard Sues as Noisey
Roland Dupree as Pee Wee
Betty Compson (uncredited)

Soundtrack 
 "Annabella" (by Johnny Lange and Lew Porter)
 "It Makes No Difference When You're in the Army" (by Johnny Lange and Lew Porter)
 "I've Learned to Smile Again" (by Neville Fleeson)
 "Good News Tomorrow" (by Neville Fleeson)
 "Put Your Trust in the Moon" (by Joan Baldwin and Charles R. Callender)
 "Miss America" (by Earl Hammand and Lee Ellon)

Production
Grace Hayes was famous as a performer, and for opening the "movie stars' hang-out", Grace Hayes Lodge, and the chic Las Vegas nightclub, The Red Rooster.

Peter Lind Hayes and Mary Healy were married from 1940 until Hayes' death in 1998, and regularly worked together, notably on the film The 5,000 Fingers of Dr. T (1953).

Katzman hired a musical troupe to perform numbers live to promote the film.

References

External links 

1941 films
1940s English-language films
American black-and-white films
1941 romantic comedy films
1941 musical comedy films
Monogram Pictures films
American romantic musical films
1940s romantic musical films
Films directed by William Nigh
1940s American films